The Wilson Post is a newspaper based in Lebanon, Tennessee that provides coverage to Wilson County, Tennessee. The newspaper is primarily an online outlet, with news distributed by its website, wilsonpost.com, but also publishes in print.

History
The Wilson Post was founded in June 2003 with the launch of its website. The newspapers has received multiple awards from the Tennessee Press Association, including for general overall excellence in 2015 and 2017, and multiple special awards for different sections in 2018.

References

Internet properties established in 2003
Mass media in Wilson County, Tennessee
Publications established in 2003
2003 establishments in Tennessee
Lebanon, Tennessee